Ange-Félix Patassé (January 25, 1937 – April 5, 2011) was a Central African politician who was President of the Central African Republic from 1993 until 2003, when he was deposed by the rebel leader François Bozizé in the 2003 coup d'état. Patassé was the first president in the CAR's history (since 1960) to be chosen in what was generally regarded as a fairly democratic election (1993) in that it was brought about by donor pressure on President André Kolingba and assisted by the United Nations Electoral Assistance Unit. He was chosen a second time in a fair election (1999) as well. However, during his first term in office (1993–1999), three military mutinies in 1996–1997 led to increasing conflict between so-called "northerners" (like Patassé) and "southerners" (like his predecessor President André Kolingba). Expatriate  mediators and peacekeeping troops were brought in to negotiate peace accords between Patassé and the mutineers and to maintain law and order. During his second term as president, Patassé increasingly lost the support of many of his long-time allies as well as the French, who had intervened to support him during his first term in office. Patassé was ousted in March 2003 and went into exile in Togo.

Background 
Patassé was born in Paoua, the capital of the northwestern province of Ouham Pendé in the colony of Ubangi-Shari in French Equatorial Africa, and he belonged to the Sara-Kaba ethnic group which predominates in the region around Paoua. Patassé's father, Paul Ngakoutou, who had served in the Free French military forces during the Second World War and afterwards worked for the colonial administration in the Province of Ouham-Pendé, was a member of the Sara-kaba people and was raised in a small village to the northeast of Boguila. Patassé's mother, Véronique Goumba, belonged to the Kare ethnic group of northwestern Ubangi-Shari. As Patassé spent much of his youth in Paoua he was associated with the Ouham-Pendé province and many of his most loyal political supporters were ethnic Kaba. After attending school in Ubangi-Shari, Patassé studied in an agricultural institute in Puy-de-Dôme, France, where he received a Technical Baccalaureate which allowed him to enroll in the Superior Academy of Tropical Agriculture in Nogent-sur-Marne, and then in the National Agronomical Institute in Paris. Specializing in zootechnology, he received a diploma from the Center for the Artificial Insemination of Domestic Animals in Rambouillet, France. He finished his studies in Paris in 1959, a year before the independence of the Central African Republic.

Political career

1960s–1970s: Rise to power
Patassé joined the Central African civil service in 1959, shortly before independence. He became an agricultural engineer and agricultural inspector in the Ministry of Agriculture in July 1963, under President David Dacko. In December 1965, Dacko appointed him Director of Agriculture and Minister of Development. In 1966, Jean-Bédel Bokassa took power in a coup d'état. Patassé was the "cousin" of President Bokassa's principal wife, Catherine Denguiadé, and gained the confidence of the new president, serving in almost all the governments formed by Bokassa. After Bokassa's creation of the Council for the Central African Revolution (in imitation of the Libyan Revolutionary Command Council), Patassé was named a member of the Council of the Revolution with the rank of Prime Minister in charge of Posts and Communications, Tourism, Water, Forests, Hunting and Fishing, as well as Custodian of the Seats of State (September 4, 1976 – December 14, 1976). During this period Patassé followed Bokassa in becoming a convert to Islam for a few months, and changed his name to Mustafa Patassé. After Bokassa became Emperor Bokassa I, Patassé was named Prime Minister and Head of the first Imperial Government. He remained in this position for 2 1/2 years, when a public announcement was made that Patassé had stepped down from office due to health problems. Patassé then left for France, where he remained in exile until the overthrow of Bokassa in September 1979. Shortly before Bokassa's overthrow, Patassé announced his opposition to the Emperor and founded the Front de Libération du Peuple Centrafricain (FLPC; Front for the Liberation of the Central African People).

Emperor Bokassa was overthrown and President David Dacko restored to power by the French in 1979. Dacko ordered Patassé to be put under house arrest. Patassé attempted to escape to the Republic of Chad, but failed and was arrested again. He was later released due to alleged health problems.

Ministerial roles under Bokassa
 Minister of Development (January 1, 1966 – April 5, 1968)
 Minister of Transport and Energy (April 5, 1968 – September 17, 1969)
 Minister of State for Development, Tourism, Transport and Energy (September 17, 1969 – February 4, 1970)
 Minister of State for Agriculture, Animal Husbandry, Waters, Forests, Hunting, Tourism and Transport (February 4, 1970 – June 25, 1970)
 Minister of State for Development (June 25, 1970 – August 19, 1970)
 Minister of State for Transport and Commerce (August 19, 1970 – November 25, 1970)
 Minister of State for the Organization of Transport by Roads, Rivers and Air (November 25, 1970 – October 19, 1971)
 Minister of State for Civil Aviation (October 19, 1971 – May 13, 1972)
 Minister of State for delegated by the President of the Republic for Rural Development (May 13, 1972 – March 20, 1973)
 Minister of State for Public Health and Social Affairs (March 20, 1973 – October 16, 1973)
 Minister of State delegated by the President of the Republic for Missions (October 16, 1973 – February 1, 1974)
 Minister of State for Tourism, Waters, Forests, Hunting and Fishing (June 15, 1974 – April 4, 1976)
 Minister of State serving as Agricultural Councilor for the Head of State (April 10, 1976 – May 24, 1976)
 Minister of State for Tourism, Water, Forests, Hunting and Fishing (May 24, 1976 – September 4, 1976)

1980s: Return to politics and further exile
Patassé returned to the CAR to present himself as a candidate for the presidential election of March 15, 1981, after which it was announced that Patassé gained 38% of the votes and thus came in second, after President Dacko. Patassé denounced the election results as rigged. Several months later, on September 1, 1981, General André Kolingba overthrew Dacko in a bloodless coup and took power, after which he forbade political activity in the country. Patassé felt obliged to leave the Central African Republic to live in exile once again, but on February 27, 1982, Patassé returned to the Central African Republic and participated in an unsuccessful coup d'état against General Kolingba with the help of a few military officers such as General François Bozizé. Four days later, having failed to gain the support of the military forces, Patassé went in disguise to the French Embassy to seek refuge. After heated negotiations between President Kolingba and the French, Patassé was allowed to leave for exile in Togo. After remaining abroad for almost a decade, of which several years were spent in France, Patassé returned to the Central African Republic in 1992 to participate in presidential elections as head of the Movement for the Liberation of the Central African People (MLPC). The donor community, with the fall of the Soviet Union, saw no need to prop up the Kolingba regime and so had pressed for change helping to organize elections with some help from the UN Electoral Assistance Unit and with logistical support from the French army.

1990s: Return to power
After the Kolingba regime sabotaged a first set of elections in 1992, which Patassé would have probably won, a second set of elections was held and on the second round on September 19, 1993, he came in first with 37 percent of the vote—well ahead of his nearest competitors, Kolingba, David Dacko and Abel Goumba.  He defeated Goumba in the runoff. Largely thanks to the foreign pressure notably from the USA and technical support from the UN, for the first time the elections were fair and democratic. Patassé thus became the first president in the nation's history to gain power by such means. When he took office on October 22, 1993; it marked the first (and to date, only) time in the country's history that a sitting government peacefully surrendered power to the opposition.

He had the support of most of his own sara-kaba people, the largest ethno-linguistic group in the Central African Republic, as well as the Souma people of his "hometown" of Paoua and the Kare people of his mother. Most of his supporters lived in the most populous northwestern savanna regions of the CAR, and thus came to be called "northerners", whereas all previous presidents were from either the forest or Ubangi river regions in the south, and so their supporters came to be called "southerners". As a populist, Patassé promoted himself as a candidate who represented a majority of the population against the privileges of southerners who held a disproportionate number of lucrative jobs in the public and parastatal sectors of the economy. As President, Patassé began to replace many "southerners" with "northerners" in these jobs which infuriated many Yakoma people in particular who had benefited from the patronage of former President Kolingba.
During Patassé's first six-year term in office (October 22, 1993 – 1999), the economy appeared to improve a little as the flow of donor money started up again following the elections and the apparent legitimacy they brought. There were three consecutive mutinies in 1996–1997, during which destruction of buildings and property had an adverse impact on the economy. The first mutiny began in May 1996. Patassé's government successfully regained control with the help of François Bozizé and the French, but his obvious dependency on the French, against whom he had regularly railed, reduced his standing further. His subsequent use of Libyan troops as a body guard did nothing to help his reputation, either locally or with the donor community and the USA even closed their embassy temporarily. The last and most serious mutiny continued until early 1997, when a semblance of order was restored after the signing of the Bangui Agreements, and with the help of troops from Burkina Faso, Chad, Gabon, Mali, Senegal, and Togo. The Security Council of the United Nations approved a mission for peace, MINURCA, in 1998. MINURCA was made up of 1,350 African soldiers. These mutinies greatly increased the tension between "northerners" and "southerners" in the CAR and thus polarized society to a greater extent than before.
In the presidential election of September 1999, Patassé won easily, defeating former presidents Kolingba and Dacko, winning in the first round with about 51.6% of the vote. Opposition leaders accused the elections of being rigged. During his second term, Patassé, whose rule had always been erratic and arbitrary, became increasingly unpopular. In 2000, he may have had his former prime-minister Jean-Luc Mandaba and his son poisoned on suspicion of planning a coup. There were failed coup attempts against him in 2001 and 2002, which he suspected Andre Kolingba and/or General François Bozizé were involved in, but when Patassé attempted to have Bozizé arrested, the general left the country for Chad with military forces which were loyal to him.

2003–2008: Ouster and criminal charges
Patassé left the country for a conference in Niger in 2003, and in his absence Bozizé seized Bangui on March 15. Although this takeover was internationally condemned, no attempt was made to depose the new leader. Patassé then went into exile in Togo.

Although nominated as the MLPC's presidential candidate in November 2004, on December 30, 2004 Patassé was barred from running in the 2005 presidential election due to what the Constitutional Court considered problems with his birth certificate and land title. He was one of seven candidates barred, while five, including Bozizé, were permitted to stand. After an agreement signed in Libreville, Gabon on January 22, 2005, all barred presidential candidates were permitted to stand in the March 13 election except for Patassé, on the grounds that he was the subject of judicial proceedings. The MLPC instead backed his last prime minister, Martin Ziguélé, for president.

Patassé was accused of stealing 70 billion Central African francs from the country's treasury. He denied this and in an interview with Agence France-Presse on December 21, 2004, he stated that he had no idea where he could have found so much money to steal in a country with a budget of only 90–100 billion francs. He was also accused of war crimes in connection with the violence that followed a failed 2002 coup attempt, in which rebels from the northern Democratic Republic of the Congo came to Patassé's assistance, but were accused of committing many atrocities in the process. Patassé, the Congolese rebel leader Jean-Pierre Bemba and three others were charged in September 2004. Hague referral for African pair However, the government of the Central African Republic was unable to arrest them, so the courts referred the matter in April 2006 to the International Criminal Court.

In March 2006, the Central African government accused Patassé of recruiting rebels and foreign mercenaries, establishing a training camp for them on the Sudanese border, and planning to destabilize the country. Acute typhoid fever kills 16, 144 infected afriquecentrale.info - Bangui accuse le tyran Patassé

At an extraordinary congress of the MLPC in June 2006, Patassé was suspended from the party for one year, while Ziguélé was elected as President of the MPLC. Patassé suspendu du MLPC : webzinemaker In August 2006 a court in the Central African Republic sentenced Patassé in absentia to 20 years of hard labor after a trial over the financial misconduct charges.  At the MLPC's third ordinary congress in June 2007, Patassé was suspended from the party for three years, until the next party congress, with the threat of being expelled from the party altogether if he speaks on its behalf without approval while he is suspended. AGENCE CENTRAFRIQUE PRESSE

2008–2011: Return to Bangui, last presidential campaign, and death
On December 7, 2008, Patassé returned to the Central African Republic for the first time since his ouster in order to participate in a national dialogue, with the government's permission. Arriving at the airport in Bangui, he kissed the ground and said that he had "not come to judge but to find grounds for entente and to tackle the problems of the Central African Republic". At the dialogue, Patassé said that the political situation should be resolved not through removing Bozizé from office, but through "democratic, transparent and fair elections in 2010".

Patassé said in June 2009 that he would be leaving his Togolese exile and returning to Bangui in preparation for the 2010 presidential election, in which he planned to stand as a candidate. Although Ziguélé had taken over the MPLC, Patassé declared that he would convene a party congress upon his return. He eventually returned to Bangui on October 30, 2009, amidst a "discreet atmosphere". He subsequently met with Bozizé on November 9. Following the meeting, Patassé thanked Bozizé in a statement and said that they had discussed the Central African Republic's problems "in a brotherly atmosphere". He also reiterated his intention to stand as a presidential candidate in 2010.

Patassé placed second in the January 2011 presidential election, far behind Bozizé, although ill-health had impeded his campaigning. He suffered from diabetes and was prevented from leaving the country for treatment in Equatorial Guinea in March 2011.  He was eventually allowed to travel, but was hospitalised at Douala in Cameroon en route to Malabo, and died there on April 5, 2011.  There were calls for a state funeral.

Personal life
While in exile in Togo from 1982 to 1992, Patassé separated from his first wife, Lucienne. He then married a Togolese woman, Angèle, and during his subsequent exile in Togo, beginning in 2003, he lived with her there. She died in Lomé on December 3, 2007 at the age of 52.

Further reading
 Jean-Marc Aractingi, La Politique à mes trousses (Politics at my heels), Editions l'Harmattan, Paris, 2006, Central Africa Chapter.
  O’Toole, Thomas. "The Central African Republic: Political Reform and Social Malaise." In John F. Clark & David E. Gardinier, eds., Political Reform in Francophone Africa. Boulder, Colorado: Westview Press, 1997.
  Mehler, Andreas. "The Shaky Foundations, Adverse Circumstances, and Limited Achievements of Democratic Transition in the Central African Republic." In The Fate of Africa's Democratic Experiments: Elites and Institutions, ed. by Leonardo A. Villalón and Peter VonDoepp. Bloomington: Indiana University Press, 2005, pp. 126–152.
  Bradshaw, Richard. "Ending a Central African Mutiny." Christian Science Monitor, January 11, 1998.
  Kalck, Pierre. Historical Dictionary of the Central African Republic. 3rd ed. Trans. Thomas O'Toole. Metuchen, N.J. & London: The Scarecrow Press, 2004.
  Saulnier, Pierre. Le Centrafrique: Entre mythe et réalité. Paris, L’Harmattan, 1998.
  Titley, Brian. Dark Age: The Political Odyssey of Emperor Bokassa. London & Montreal: McGill–Queen's University Press, 1997.

References

Heads of state of the Central African Republic
Leaders ousted by a coup
Prime Ministers of the Central African Republic
Movement for the Liberation of the Central African People politicians
1937 births
2011 deaths
1990s in the Central African Republic
2000s in the Central African Republic
People from Ouham-Pendé
Sara people
Converts to Islam from Christianity
Converts to Christianity from Islam
Agriculture ministers of the Central African Republic
Energy ministers of the Central African Republic
Health ministers of the Central African Republic
Tourism ministers of the Central African Republic
Transport ministers of the Central African Republic
Central African Republic exiles